USS Goldfinch may refer to the following ships operated by the United States Navy:

 , a minesweeper built as the trawler Fordham in 1929
 , a wooden-hulled motor minesweeper, was commissioned 20 January 1944
 Goldfinch (AM-395), was authorized for construction on 16 May 1945 but her contract was canceled 1 November 1945

United States Navy ship names